The 2016 Cape Verdean Football Championship season was the 37th beginner level (likely amateur) competition of the first-tier football in Cape Verde.  It started on 14 May and finished on 9 July, it started five days later than last season and finished two days earlier, the season was a week shorter than last.  The championship was governed by the Cape Verdean Football Federation.  The scheduling was completed on November 16 and the group system was kept instead of becoming a one portion season without playoffs and was the last time.  CS Mindelense won the record breaking title and became the second club after Sporting Praia to win four in a row, the highest ever, also it was Mindelense's last.  Mindelense chose to not participate in the CAF Champions League competition in 2017, Académica do Porto Novo did not participate in the  2017 CAF Confederation Cup, both of the clubs due to financial concerns, of any club, it is the eighth consecutive time and becomes the recent African nation not to bring a champion to the continentals for the most consecutive years, in the cup competition, Cape Verde is the longest for not bringing a club in Africa lasting for more than 15 years straight, not even the three national cup winners competed. Mindelense qualified and participated in the 2017 National Championships.

Overview
The triangular phase started to be used for the 2017 season, it became the fourth time and first with four clubs each and with playoffs.

CS Mindelense was the defending team of the title.  A total of 12 clubs participated in the competition, one from each island league and one who won the last season's title.  The finals had two matches, Académica scored the first and Mindelense score the second leg, each with a goal, the second match went into extra time and again went into the penalty shootout, this was the first time that the season had the finals with two consecutive penalty shootouts, Mindelense won the shootout by four and claimed the recent national title.

Six clubs returned again, Desportivo da Praia returned in three years, Sport Sal Rei Club returned in five years and Vulcânicos returned in several years, Sinagoga of Santo Antão and Varandinha of Tarrafal de Santiago, two clubs competed for the first time.  Varandinha's appearance was the first from the Santiago North Zone into the semifinals.  At the finals, it was the sixth time that the two clubs were from Barlavento known as the Battle of Barlavento.

The biggest win was Mindelense, who scored 5-2 over Sal Rei from Boa Vista, the rest of the matches had a maximum of three goals in some of its matches as it was a low scoring season, one fifth approximately of last season, though overall are ranked third, the second highest match was Varandinha - Mindelense who Mindelense won 1-4.  In Group A, neither club scored ten goals while only Mindelense from Group B scored eleven, the second club in the group scored eight and was fifth placed Sal Rei.   Vulcânicos scored the fewest with two goals.   Overall, Mindelense scored 16 goals, Derby and Varandinha second with ten goals and Académica Porto Novo and Sal Rei fourth with eight goals.

One match, Desportivo Praia and Varandinha originally for mid-May, on May 13, it was rescheduled to June 1, the main reason that on an April 3 match (19th round) featuring Desportivo Santa Cruz and Scorpion Vermelho that Desportivo fielded an ineligible player, it occurred after the goals were scored and the award to Scorpion Vermelho in mid-May was revoked and the 2-0 result was kept along with Varandinha first championship title.  The next such delay was in 2017.

Participating clubs

 CS Mindelense, winner of the 2015 Cape Verdean Football Championships
 Sport Sal Rei Club, winner of the Boa Vista Island League
 Sporting Clube da Brava, winner of the Brava Island League
 Vulcânicos, winner of the Fogo Island League
 Académico 83, winner of the Maio Island League
 Académico do Aeroporto, winner of the Sal Island League
 Varandinha, winner of the Santiago Island League (North)
 Desportivo da Praia, winner of the Santiago Island League (South)
 Clube Desportivo Sinagoga, winner of the Santo Antão Island League (North)
 Académica do Porto Novo, winner of the Santo Antão Island League (South)
 SC Atlético, winner of the São Nicolau Island League
 FC Derby, runner up of the São Vicente Island League

Information about the clubs

Italics indicates a team playing in a stadium in a different town or city.

League standings
Group A

Group B

Results

Final stages

Semi-finals

Finals

Statistics
Highest scoring match: Mindelense 5-2 Sport Sal Rei Clube 4 June

See also
2015–16 in Cape Verdean football

References

External links

2016 Cape Verdean Football Championships at RSSSF

Cape Verdean Football Championship seasons
1
Cape